is a railway station in Shiroishi, Kishima District, Saga Prefecture, Japan. It is operated by JR Kyushu and is on the Nagasaki Main Line.

Lines

Station layout 
The station consists of two side platforms serving two tracks. A siding branches off track 1. The station building, a simple concrete structure, is unstaffed and serves only as a waiting room. Access to the opposite side platform is by means of a footbridge.

Adjacent stations

History
Japanese Government Railways (JGR) built the station in the 1930s during the development of an alternative route for the Nagasaki Main Line along the coast of the Ariake Sea. With the privatization of Japanese National Railways (JNR), the successor of JGR, on 1 April 1987, control of the station passed to JR Kyushu.

Passenger statistics
In fiscal 2016, the daily average number of passengers using the station (boarding passengers only) was above 100 and below 323. The station did not rank among the top 300 busiest stations of JR Kyushu.

Surrounding area
The town proper of the former municipality of Ariake is to the northeast of the station.
Shiroishi City Hall, Main Branch (白石町役場本庁)
Ariake Junior High School
National Route 207

See also
 List of railway stations in Japan

References

External links
Hizen-Ryūō Station (JR Kyushu)

Railway stations in Saga Prefecture
Nagasaki Main Line
Railway stations in Japan opened in 1930